Eduardo Galvão (19 April 1962 – 7 December 2020) was a Brazilian actor. He participated in the Caça Talentos program, on Rede Globo, alongside Angélica. He died on the night of 7 December 2020, aged 58, of COVID-19 during the COVID-19 pandemic in Brazil. The 7th-day mass in his honour was celebrated on 14 December 2020.

Career
Galvão debuted in soap operas at the age of 27, in O Salvador da Pátria, in 1989. His most prominent roles were Paschoal Papagaio, in Despedida de Solteiro, in 1992, Mauro Botelho in A Viagem, in 1994 and Arthur Carneiro, in the series Caça- Talents, from 1996 to 1998, Otacilio Ferraço in Porto dos Milagres in 2001, Armando Bananeira in O Beijo do Vampiro in 2002 and as Dr. Roger Machado in Bom Sucesso in 2019.

Filmography

Film

Television

References

External links

Brazilian film actors
Brazilian male actors
Brazilian male telenovela actors
Actors from Rio de Janeiro (state)
1962 births
2020 deaths
Deaths from the COVID-19 pandemic in Rio de Janeiro (state)
People from Rio de Janeiro (city)